Dibenzopyrenes are a group of high molecular weight polycyclic aromatic hydrocarbons with the molecular formula C24H14.  There are five isomers of dibenzopyrene which differ by the arrangement of aromatic rings: dibenzo[a,e]pyrene, dibenzo[a,h]pyrene, dibenzo[a,i]pyrene, dibenzo[a,l]pyrene, and dibenzo[e,l]pyrene.

Dibenzopyrenes have been recognized for their suspected human carcinogenicity.  The most notable dibenzopyrene isomer, dibenzo[a,l]pyrene is a constituent of tobacco smoke and is thought to be 30 to 100 times more potent as a carcinogen than benzo[a]pyrene.  The four dibenzopyrene isomers; dibenzo[a,e]pyrene, dibenzo[a,h]pyrene, dibenzo[a,i]pyrene, dibenzo[a,l]pyrene are included in the list of 16 EU priority polycyclic aromatic hydrocarbons due to their mutagenicity and suspected human carcinogenicity.

Primary sources of dibenzopyrenes in the environment are combustion of wood and coal, gasoline and diesel exhaust, and tires.

References

Polycyclic aromatic hydrocarbons